The 1969 Philadelphia Phillies season was a season in American baseball. The team finished fifth in the newly established National League East with a record of 63–99, 37 games behind the division champion New York Mets, who went on to defeat Baltimore, four games to one, in the World Series.  It was also the Phillies' penultimate season at Connie Mack Stadium.

Offseason 
 October 14, 1968: 1968 MLB expansion draft
Larry Jackson was drafted from the Phillies by the Montreal Expos as the 23rd pick. Jackson retired rather than report to the Expos. Bobby Wine was sent to the Expos as compensation on April 7, 1969.
Tony González was drafted from the Phillies by the San Diego Padres as the 37th pick.
 December 2, 1968: Billy Cowan was drafted from the Phillies by the New York Yankees in the 1968 rule 5 draft.
 January 20, 1969: Clay Dalrymple was traded by the Phillies to the Baltimore Orioles for Ron Stone.

Regular season 
1969 was a year of transition for the organization. Dick Allen was suspended by the team for a month after missing a game against the New York Mets. Claiming that Allen was undermining him by going directly to owner R. R. M. Carpenter, Jr., manager Bob Skinner surprised the club by resigning on August 6. Skinner blasted the club for their handling of Allen and blamed Allen for the team's losing saying, "Allen has been a big factor in our losing and there is very definitely disharmony on the club." Skinner was replaced by coach George Myatt. Allen would be traded from the club after the season. In addition to the turmoil in the clubhouse, the Phillies had expected that 1969 would be their final season at Connie Mack Stadium with an April 1970 opening planned for Veterans Stadium. Delays would push the Vet's opening to April 1971.

At Connie Mack Stadium on April 17, 1969, Montreal Expos pitcher Bill Stoneman threw a no-hitter against the Phillies. It was Stoneman's fifth major league start and only the ninth game of the Expos' existence.

In conjunction with Major League Baseball's celebration in 1969 of the 100th anniversary of professional baseball, the Phillies conducted a fan vote to determine their all-time team. The players were honored on August 5, 1969, at Connie Mack Stadium before the Phillies' game against the San Francisco Giants. Commissioner Bowie Kuhn was on hand to recognize Robin Roberts as the Phillies' greatest player of all time.

The Phillies recorded four straight complete-game shutouts from August 13 to 16, 1969. The Phillies shutout the Atlanta Braves two games in a row in Atlanta then returned to Philadelphia, where they shut out the Houston Astros in the following two games.

Season standings

Record vs. opponents

Notable transactions 
 June 5, 1969: Bob Boone was drafted by the Phillies in the 6th round of the 1969 Major League Baseball draft. Player signed June 11, 1969.

Game log

|- style="background:#fbb"
| 1 || April 8 || @ Cubs || 6–7 (11) || Phil Regan (1–0) || Barry Lersch (0–1) || None || 40,796 || 0–1
|- style="background:#fbb"
| 2 || April 9 || @ Cubs || 3–11 || Bill Hands (1–0) || Rick Wise (0–1) || None || 6,297 || 0–2
|- style="background:#fbb"
| 3 || April 10 || @ Cubs || 2–6 || Ken Holtzman (1–0) || Woodie Fryman (0–1) || None || 5,422 || 0–3
|- style="background:#fbb"
| 4 || April 11 || @ Pirates || 1–7 || Bob Moose (1–0) || Jerry Johnson (0–1) || None || 31,641 || 0–4
|- style="background:#bfb"
| 5 || April 12 || @ Pirates || 8–1 || Grant Jackson (1–0) || Jim Bunning (0–1) || None || 12,474 || 1–4
|- style="background:#fbb"
| 6 || April 13 || @ Pirates || 5–6 || Ron Kline (1–0) || Bill Wilson (0–1) || None || 14,981 || 1–5
|- style="background:#bfb"
| 7 || April 14 || Mets || 5–1 || Woodie Fryman (1–1) || Jim McAndrew (0–1) || None || 13,070 || 2–5
|- style="background:#fbb"
| 8 || April 15 || Mets || 3–6 || Gary Gentry (2–0) || Gary Wagner (0–1) || Cal Koonce (2) || 2,880 || 2–6
|- style="background:#bbb"
| – || April 16 || Expos || colspan=6 | Postponed (rain); Makeup: July 4 as a traditional double-header
|- style="background:#fbb"
| 9 || April 17 || Expos || 0–7 || Bill Stoneman (1–2) || Jerry Johnson (0–2) || None || 6,496 || 2–7
|- style="background:#bbb"
| – || April 18 || Pirates || colspan=6 | Postponed (rain); Makeup: September 15 as a traditional double-header
|- style="background:#fbb"
| 10 || April 19 || Pirates || 6–8 || Steve Blass (1–0) || Grant Jackson (1–1) || Bruce Dal Canton (1) || 3,953 || 2–8
|- style="background:#bfb"
| 11 || April 20 || Pirates || 7–1 || Rick Wise (1–1) || Bob Veale (1–2) || Barry Lersch (1) || 4,930 || 3–8
|- style="background:#bfb"
| 12 || April 21 || @ Mets || 2–1 (11) || Woodie Fryman (2–1) || Ron Taylor (0–1) || Barry Lersch (2) || 9,286 || 4–8
|- style="background:#bbb"
| – || April 22 || @ Mets || colspan=6 | Postponed (wet grounds and rain); Makeup: September 5 as a traditional double-header
|- style="background:#bbb"
| – || April 23 || @ Expos || colspan=6 | Postponed (rain); Makeup: September 19 as a traditional double-header
|- style="background:#bfb"
| 13 || April 24 || @ Expos || 7–1 || Rick Wise (2–1) || Mudcat Grant (1–1) || None || 5,116 || 5–8
|- style="background:#bfb"
| 14 || April 25 || Cardinals || 5–1 || Grant Jackson (2–1) || Bob Gibson (1–2) || None || 7,710 || 6–8
|- style="background:#fbb"
| 15 || April 26 || Cardinals || 4–10 || Ron Willis (1–0) || Barry Lersch (0–2) || Joe Hoerner (3) || 8,942 || 6–9
|- style="background:#bfb"
| 16 || April 27 || Cardinals || 1–0 || Jerry Johnson (1–2) || Ray Washburn (2–2) || None || 7,565 || 7–9
|- style="background:#fbb"
| 17 || April 28 || Cubs || 1–2 (10) || Ted Abernathy (2–0) || Rick Wise (2–2) || None || 4,438 || 7–10
|- style="background:#fbb"
| 18 || April 29 || Cubs || 0–10 || Ferguson Jenkins (4–1) || Grant Jackson (2–2) || None || 3,811 || 7–11
|- style="background:#bfb"
| 19 || April 30 || Cubs || 3–1 || Woodie Fryman (3–1) || Bill Hands (3–2) || None || 2,930 || 8–11
|-

|- style="background:#bfb"
| 20 || May 2 || @ Cardinals || 7–2 || Jerry Johnson (2–2) || Ray Washburn (2–3) || Turk Farrell (1) || 17,916 || 9–11
|- style="background:#bfb"
| 21 || May 3 || @ Cardinals || 4–1 || Rick Wise (3–2) || Steve Carlton (2–3) || None || 16,796 || 10–11
|- style="background:#bfb"
| 22 || May 4 || @ Cardinals || 5–0 || Grant Jackson (3–2) || Dave Giusti (2–3) || None || 15,511 || 11–11
|- style="background:#bfb"
| 23 || May 6 || Astros || 5–4 || Turk Farrell (1–0) || Dooley Womack (1–1) || None || 3,544 || 12–11
|- style="background:#fbb"
| 24 || May 7 || Astros || 1–6 || Larry Dierker (4–3) || Jerry Johnson (2–3) || None || 3,001 || 12–12
|- style="background:#fbb"
| 25 || May 8 || Astros || 7–9 || Jack Billingham (2–2) || Gary Wagner (0–2) || Fred Gladding (4) || 2,113 || 12–13
|- style="background:#bbb"
| – || May 9 || Braves || colspan=6 | Postponed (rain); Makeup: July 29 as a traditional double-header
|- style="background:#fbb"
| 26 || May 10 || Braves || 3–6 || Pat Jarvis (2–2) || Grant Jackson (3–3) || Cecil Upshaw (7) || 7,313 || 12–14
|- style="background:#fbb"
| 27 || May 11 || Braves || 3–4 || Phil Niekro (6–1) || Turk Farrell (1–1) || None || 4,105 || 12–15
|- style="background:#fbb"
| 28 || May 13 || Reds || 4–6 || Clay Carroll (2–3) || Turk Farrell (1–2) || George Culver (1) || 4,474 || 12–16
|- style="background:#fbb"
| 29 || May 14 || Reds || 2–4 || Jim Merritt (3–2) || Grant Jackson (3–4) || George Culver (2) || 4,532 || 12–17
|- style="background:#bfb"
| 30 || May 15 || Reds || 7–0 || Rick Wise (4–2) || Tony Cloninger (1–5) || None || 3,294 || 13–17
|- style="background:#bfb"
| 31 || May 16 || Giants || 3–1 || Woodie Fryman (4–1) || Mike McCormick (1–1) || None || 12,587 || 14–17
|- style="background:#fbb"
| 32 || May 17 || Giants || 0–5 || Gaylord Perry (6–3) || Gary Wagner (0–3) || None || 12,514 || 14–18
|- style="background:#bfb"
| 33 || May 18 || Giants || 9–8 || Turk Farrell (2–2) || Bobby Bolin (2–3) || None || 17,534 || 15–18
|- style="background:#fbb"
| 34 || May 20 || @ Reds || 0–4 || Tony Cloninger (2–5) || Rick Wise (4–3) || None || 4,191 || 15–19
|- style="background:#fbb"
| 35 || May 21 || @ Reds || 5–6 || Clay Carroll (3–3) || Jerry Johnson (2–4) || None || 4,811 || 15–20
|- style="background:#bfb"
| 36 || May 23 || @ Braves || 6–2 || Grant Jackson (4–4) || Milt Pappas (3–3) || None || 14,868 || 16–20
|- style="background:#bfb"
| 37 || May 24 || @ Braves || 8–3 || Rick Wise (5–3) || Ron Reed (5–2) || Bill Wilson (1) || 20,610 || 17–20
|- style="background:#fbb"
| 38 || May 25 || @ Braves || 1–4 || George Stone (5–0) || Jerry Johnson (2–5) || Cecil Upshaw (10) || 35,172 || 17–21
|- style="background:#fbb"
| 39 || May 27 || @ Astros || 2–6 || Don Wilson (5–4) || Bill Wilson (0–2) || None || 13,188 || 17–22
|- style="background:#fbb"
| 40 || May 28 || @ Astros || 6–7 (10) || Jim Ray (2–0) || Barry Lersch (0–3) || None || 17,298 || 17–23
|- style="background:#bfb"
| 41 || May 30 || Dodgers || 13–6 || Woodie Fryman (5–1) || Alan Foster (0–3) || Al Raffo (1) || 10,737 || 18–23
|- style="background:#fbb"
| 42 || May 31 || Dodgers || 6–7 || Bill Singer (7–4) || Grant Jackson (4–5) || Jim Brewer (5) || 11,345 || 18–24
|-

|- style="background:#fbb"
| 43 || June 1 || Dodgers || 4–12 || Don Sutton (7–4) || Rick Wise (5–4) || Al McBean (3) || 11,713 || 18–25
|- style="background:#fbb"
| 44 || June 2 || Padres || 4–6 || Al Santorini (3–2) || Jerry Johnson (2–6) || Gary Ross (1) || 3,292 || 18–26
|- style="background:#fbb"
| 45 || June 3 || Padres || 5–6 || Clay Kirby (2–6) || Woodie Fryman (5–2) || Billy McCool (2) || 3,646 || 18–27
|- style="background:#fbb"
| 46 || June 4 || Padres || 0–3 || Dick Kelley (3–4) || Bill Champion (0–1) || Billy McCool (3) || 3,428 || 18–28
|- style="background:#fbb"
| 47 || June 6 || @ Giants || 0–4 || Gaylord Perry (8–5) || Rick Wise (5–5) || None || 6,355 || 18–29
|- style="background:#fbb"
| 48 || June 7 || @ Giants || 1–3 || Juan Marichal (6–2) || Grant Jackson (4–6) || None || 7,522 || 18–30
|- style="background:#fbb"
| 49 || June 8 || @ Giants || 8–9 (12) || Frank Linzy (3–2) || Al Raffo (0–1) || None || 9,055 || 18–31
|- style="background:#fbb"
| 50 || June 10 || @ Dodgers || 1–2 || Don Sutton (9–4) || Woodie Fryman (5–3) || None || 13,166 || 18–32
|- style="background:#bfb"
| 51 || June 11 || @ Dodgers || 3–0 || Bill Champion (1–1) || Claude Osteen (8–5) || None || 13,249 || 19–32
|- style="background:#bfb"
| 52 || June 12 || @ Dodgers || 1–0 || Grant Jackson (5–6) || Bill Singer (7–6) || None || 13,846 || 20–32
|- style="background:#bfb"
| 53 || June 13 || @ Padres || 6–1 || Rick Wise (6–5) || Johnny Podres (5–5) || None || 5,018 || 21–32
|- style="background:#bfb"
| 54 || June 14 || @ Padres || 7–5 || Jerry Johnson (3–6) || Al Santorini (3–4) || Turk Farrell (2) || 6,127 || 22–32
|- style="background:#bfb"
| 55 || June 15 || @ Padres || 5–4 (10) || Woodie Fryman (6–3) || Clay Kirby (2–7) || John Boozer (1) || 7,311 || 23–32
|- style="background:#fbb"
| 56 || June 17 (1) || Mets || 0–1 || Gary Gentry (6–5) || Bill Champion (1–2) || None || see 2nd game || 23–33
|- style="background:#bfb"
| 57 || June 17 (2) || Mets || 7–3 || Grant Jackson (6–6) || Don Cardwell (2–7) || None || 17,259 || 24–33
|- style="background:#fbb"
| 58 || June 18 || Mets || 0–2 || Jerry Koosman (4–4) || Rick Wise (6–6) || None || 5,608 || 24–34
|- style="background:#fbb"
| 59 || June 19 || Mets || 5–6 || Ron Taylor (3–1) || Al Raffo (0–2) || Tug McGraw (4) || 6,871 || 24–35
|- style="background:#bfb"
| 60 || June 20 || Pirates || 8–7 || Bill Wilson (1–2) || Lou Marone (0–1) || John Boozer (2) || 10,669 || 25–35
|- style="background:#fbb"
| 61 || June 21 || Pirates || 2–8 || Bruce Dal Canton (5–0) || Lowell Palmer (0–1) || None || 5,469 || 25–36
|- style="background:#fbb"
| 62 || June 22 (1) || Pirates || 0–6 || Dock Ellis (4–7) || Bill Champion (1–3) || None || see 2nd game || 25–37
|- style="background:#bfb"
| 63 || June 22 (2) || Pirates || 3–2 || Grant Jackson (7–6) || Steve Blass (7–4) || None || 33,712 || 26–37
|- style="background:#fbb"
| 64 || June 24 (1) || @ Mets || 1–2 || Tom Seaver (11–3) || Woodie Fryman (6–4) || None || see 2nd game || 26–38
|- style="background:#fbb"
| 65 || June 24 (2) || @ Mets || 0–5 || Jim McAndrew (1–2) || Jerry Johnson (3–7) || Ron Taylor (6) || 39,843 || 26–39
|- style="background:#bfb"
| 66 || June 25 || @ Mets || 6–5 (10) || Bill Wilson (2–2) || Ron Taylor (3–2) || John Boozer (3) || 27,814 || 27–39
|- style="background:#bfb"
| 67 || June 26 || @ Mets || 2–0 || Grant Jackson (8–6) || Don Cardwell (2–8) || None || 15,360 || 28–39
|- style="background:#bfb"
| 68 || June 27 || @ Expos || 8–7 || Bill Champion (2–3) || Steve Renko (0–1) || Bill Wilson (2) || 16,847 || 29–39
|- style="background:#bfb"
| 69 || June 28 || @ Expos || 13–8 || Turk Farrell (3–2) || Bill Stoneman (4–10) || John Boozer (4) || 11,150 || 30–39
|- style="background:#bfb"
| 70 || June 29 (1) || @ Expos || 2–0 || Lowell Palmer (1–1) || Jerry Robertson (1–6) || None || see 2nd game || 31–39
|- style="background:#bfb"
| 71 || June 29 (2) || @ Expos || 5–1 || Jerry Johnson (4–7) || Mike Wegener (3–5) || None || 27,169 || 32–39
|- style="background:#bfb"
| 72 || June 30 || @ Pirates || 4–2 || Woodie Fryman (7–4) || Dock Ellis (4–8) || John Boozer (5) || 17,954 || 33–39
|-

|- style="background:#bfb"
| 73 || July 1 || @ Pirates || 7–4 || Grant Jackson (9–6) || Steve Blass (8–5) || Bill Wilson (3) || 6,652 || 34–39
|- style="background:#bfb"
| 74 || July 2 || @ Pirates || 14–4 || Al Raffo (1–2) || Jim Bunning (7–6) || John Boozer (6) || 6,322 || 35–39
|- style="background:#fbb"
| 75 || July 4 (1) || Expos || 5–8 || Jerry Robertson (2–6) || Lowell Palmer (1–2) || None || see 2nd game || 35–40
|- style="background:#fbb"
| 76 || July 4 (2) || Expos || 3–7 || Howie Reed (4–1) || Jerry Johnson (4–8) || Gary Waslewski (2) || 21,521 || 35–41
|- style="background:#fbb"
| 77 || July 5 || Expos || 4–6 || Dan McGinn (4–7) || Woodie Fryman (7–5) || Dick Radatz (1) || 3,496 || 35–42
|- style="background:#bfb"
| 78 || July 6 (1) || Expos || 13–2 || Bill Champion (3–3) || Bill Stoneman (4–12) || None || see 2nd game || 36–42
|- style="background:#fbb"
| 79 || July 6 (2) || Expos || 0–5 || Gary Waslewski (1–2) || Grant Jackson (9–7) || None || 8,664 || 36–43
|- style="background:#bbb"
| – || July 7 || Cardinals || colspan=6 | Postponed (rain); Makeup: July 9 as a traditional double-header
|- style="background:#fbb"
| 80 || July 8 || Cardinals || 3–6 || Bob Gibson (11–6) || Jerry Johnson (4–9) || None || 8,522 || 36–44
|- style="background:#bfb"
| 81 || July 9 (1) || Cardinals || 7–1 || Woodie Fryman (8–5) || Nelson Briles (7–8) || None || see 2nd game || 37–44
|- style="background:#fbb"
| 82 || July 9 (2) || Cardinals || 3–5 || Nelson Briles (8–8) || Lowell Palmer (1–3) || Joe Hoerner (10) || 13,919 || 37–45
|- style="background:#fbb"
| 83 || July 10 || Cardinals || 3–9 || Mike Torrez (3–4) || Grant Jackson (9–8) || Mudcat Grant (1) || 3,888 || 37–46
|- style="background:#bfb"
| 84 || July 11 || @ Cubs || 7–5 || John Boozer (1–0) || Ted Abernathy (4–2) || Bill Wilson (4) || 24,509 || 38–46
|- style="background:#fbb"
| 85 || July 12 || @ Cubs || 4–7 || Ferguson Jenkins (12–6) || Rick Wise (6–7) || Phil Regan (8) || 26,732 || 38–47
|- style="background:#fbb"
| 86 || July 13 (1) || @ Cubs || 0–6 || Ken Holtzman (11–5) || Woodie Fryman (8–6) || None || see 2nd game || 38–48
|- style="background:#fbb"
| 87 || July 13 (2) || @ Cubs || 4–6 || Jim Colborn (1–0) || Lowell Palmer (1–4) || Rich Nye (2) || 34,913 || 38–49
|- style="background:#fbb"
| 88 || July 15 || @ Cardinals || 2–8 || Chuck Taylor (2–0) || Grant Jackson (9–9) || None || 21,846 || 38–50
|- style="background:#fbb"
| 89 || July 16 || @ Cardinals || 0–5 || Steve Carlton (12–5) || Bill Champion (3–4) || None || 24,737 || 38–51
|- style="background:#fbb"
| 90 || July 17 || @ Cardinals || 3–11 || Mike Torrez (4–4) || Rick Wise (6–8) || Ray Washburn (1) || 17,814 || 38–52
|- style="background:#fbb"
| 91 || July 18 || Cubs || 5–9 || Phil Regan (10–5) || Bill Wilson (2–3) || None || 16,751 || 38–53
|- style="background:#bfb"
| 92 || July 19 || Cubs || 5–3 || Rick Wise (7–8) || Bill Hands (11–8) || None || 4,801 || 39–53
|- style="background:#fbb"
| 93 || July 20 (1) || Cubs || 0–1 || Ferguson Jenkins (13–7) || Grant Jackson (9–10) || None || see 2nd game || 39–54
|- style="background:#fbb"
| 94 || July 20 (2) || Cubs || 1–6 || Dick Selma (10–4) || Bill Champion (3–5) || None || 12,393 || 39–55
|- style="background:#bbb"
| – || July 22 || All-Star Game || colspan=6 | Postponed (rain); Makeup: July 23
|- style="background:#bbcaff;"
| – || July 23 ||colspan="7" |1969 Major League Baseball All-Star Game at Robert F. Kennedy Memorial Stadium in Washington
|- style="background:#fbb"
| 95 || July 24 || @ Astros || 3–7 || Don Wilson (11–7) || Rick Wise (7–9) || None || 19,046 || 39–56
|- style="background:#bfb"
| 96 || July 25 || @ Astros || 7–3 || Grant Jackson (10–10) || Larry Dierker (12–8) || None || 18,285 || 40–56
|- style="background:#fbb"
| 97 || July 26 || @ Astros || 2–4 || Tom Griffin (6–4) || Lowell Palmer (1–5) || Fred Gladding (19) || 26,962 || 40–57
|- style="background:#fbb"
| 98 || July 27 || @ Astros || 2–3 (11) || Fred Gladding (2–3) || Bill Wilson (2–4) || None || 21,183 || 40–58
|- style="background:#bbb"
| – || July 29 (1) || Braves || colspan=6 | Postponed (rain); Makeup: July 30 as a traditional double-header
|- style="background:#bbb"
| – || July 29 (2) || Braves || colspan=6 | Postponed (rain); Makeup: July 31 as a traditional double-header
|- style="background:#fbb"
| 99 || July 30 (1) || Braves || 3–6 || Milt Pappas (5–8) || Grant Jackson (10–11) || Cecil Upshaw (20) || see 2nd game || 40–59
|- style="background:#bfb"
| 100 || July 30 (2) || Braves || 4–3 || Bill Champion (4–5) || George Stone (9–6) || Bill Wilson (5) || 9,391 || 41–59
|- style="background:#fbb"
| 101 || July 31 (1) || Braves || 2–4 || Pat Jarvis (9–7) || Lowell Palmer (1–6) || Claude Raymond (1) || see 2nd game || 41–60
|- style="background:#bfb"
| 102 || July 31 (2) || Braves || 9–0 || Rick Wise (8–9) || Jim Britton (5–2) || None || 8,507 || 42–60
|-

|- style="background:#fbb"
| 103 || August 1 || Reds || 6–7 || Tony Cloninger (8–13) || Woodie Fryman (8–7) || Wayne Granger (14) || 7,412 || 42–61
|- style="background:#bfb"
| 104 || August 2 || Reds || 5–3 || Grant Jackson (11–11) || Jim Merritt (10–5) || Bill Wilson (6) || 8,615 || 43–61
|- style="background:#fbb"
| 105 || August 3 || Reds || 17–19 || Wayne Granger (5–4) || Turk Farrell (3–3) || None || 13,181 || 43–62
|- style="background:#bbb"
| – || August 4 || Giants || colspan=6 | Postponed (rain); Makeup: August 5 as a traditional double-header
|- style="background:#fbb"
| 106 || August 5 (1) || Giants || 2–6 || Mike McCormick (8–5) || John Boozer (1–1) || None || see 2nd game || 43–63
|- style="background:#fbb"
| 107 || August 5 (2) || Giants || 3–5 || Bobby Bolin (6–7) || Woodie Fryman (8–8) || Frank Linzy (9) || 8,712 || 43–64
|- style="background:#bfb"
| 108 || August 6 || Giants || 5–4 || Rick Wise (9–9) || Juan Marichal (13–8) || Bill Champion (1) || 8,586 || 44–64
|- style="background:#fbb"
| 109 || August 8 || @ Reds || 5–12 || Jack Fisher (3–2) || Bill Wilson (2–5) || None || 15,263 || 44–65
|- style="background:#fbb"
| 110 || August 9 || @ Reds || 2–4 (12) || Wayne Granger (6–4) || Al Raffo (1–3) || None || 19,239 || 44–66
|- style="background:#fbb"
| 111 || August 10 || @ Reds || 0–10 || Gary Nolan (3–3) || Woodie Fryman (8–9) || None || 16,589 || 44–67
|- style="background:#fbb"
| 112 || August 11 || @ Reds || 3–4 || Jim Merritt (12–5) || Rick Wise (9–10) || Wayne Granger (16) || 12,709 || 44–68
|- style="background:#bbb"
| – || August 12 || @ Braves || colspan=6 | Postponed (rain); Makeup: August 13 as a traditional double-header
|- style="background:#fbb"
| 113 || August 13 (1) || @ Braves || 2–4 || Milt Pappas (6–9) || John Boozer (1–2) || Cecil Upshaw (22) || see 2nd game || 44–69
|- style="background:#bfb"
| 114 || August 13 (2) || @ Braves || 7–0 || Jerry Johnson (5–9) || Pat Jarvis (10–8) || None || 11,957 || 45–69
|- style="background:#bfb"
| 115 || August 14 || @ Braves || 6–0 || Woodie Fryman (9–9) || Phil Niekro (16–10) || None || 9,832 || 46–69
|- style="background:#bfb"
| 116 || August 15 || Astros || 1–0 || Grant Jackson (12–11) || Denny Lemaster (9–12) || None || 6,183 || 47–69
|- style="background:#bfb"
| 117 || August 16 || Astros || 7–0 || Rick Wise (10–10) || Tom Griffin (8–6) || None || 3,113 || 48–69
|- style="background:#fbb"
| 118 || August 17 || Astros || 2–3 || Larry Dierker (15–9) || Bill Champion (4–6) || Fred Gladding (26) || 4,795 || 48–70
|- style="background:#fbb"
| 119 || August 19 || Dodgers || 0–2 || Jim Bunning (11–9) || Woodie Fryman (9–10) || Jim Brewer (18) || 7,850 || 48–71
|- style="background:#fbb"
| 120 || August 20 || Dodgers || 5–8 || Pete Mikkelsen (5–3) || Grant Jackson (12–12) || Al McBean (4) || 8,232 || 48–72
|- style="background:#bfb"
| 121 || August 21 || Dodgers || 2–1 || Jerry Johnson (6–9) || Claude Osteen (16–11) || None || 8,357 || 49–72
|- style="background:#bfb"
| 122 || August 22 || Padres || 10–0 || Rick Wise (11–10) || Clay Kirby (3–17) || None || 3,824 || 50–72
|- style="background:#bfb"
| 123 || August 23 || Padres || 7–6 || Lowell Palmer (2–6) || Frank Reberger (1–2) || Turk Farrell (3) || 4,669 || 51–72
|- style="background:#bfb"
| 124 || August 24 || Padres || 6–4 || Woodie Fryman (10–10) || Tommie Sisk (0–8) || None || 4,761 || 52–72
|- style="background:#fbb"
| 125 || August 26 || @ Giants || 4–13 || Gaylord Perry (16–10) || Jerry Johnson (6–10) || None || 5,208 || 52–73
|- style="background:#fbb"
| 126 || August 27 || @ Giants || 7–8 (10) || Frank Linzy (11–6) || Turk Farrell (3–4) || None || 4,973 || 52–74
|- style="background:#fbb"
| 127 || August 28 || @ Giants || 3–4 || Frank Linzy (12–6) || Bill Champion (4–7) || None || 5,555 || 52–75
|- style="background:#fbb"
| 128 || August 29 || @ Dodgers || 5–6 || Pete Mikkelsen (6–3) || Woodie Fryman (10–11) || Ray Lamb (1) || 19,512 || 52–76
|- style="background:#fbb"
| 129 || August 30 || @ Dodgers || 0–2 || Claude Osteen (18–11) || Jerry Johnson (6–11) || Pete Mikkelsen (3) || 35,753 || 52–77
|- style="background:#fbb"
| 130 || August 31 || @ Dodgers || 1–4 || Bill Singer (17–8) || Rick Wise (11–11) || None || 19,357 || 52–78
|-

|- style="background:#fbb"
| 131 || September 1 || @ Padres || 2–5 || Clay Kirby (4–18) || Grant Jackson (12–13) || Gary Ross (3) || 2,703 || 52–79
|- style="background:#bfb"
| 132 || September 2 || @ Padres || 2–0 || Bill Champion (5–7) || Tommie Sisk (0–10) || None || 3,729 || 53–79
|- style="background:#bfb"
| 133 || September 3 || @ Padres || 9–1 || Woodie Fryman (11–11) || Al Santorini (6–13) || None || 6,300 || 54–79
|- style="background:#fbb"
| 134 || September 5 (1) || @ Mets || 1–5 || Tom Seaver (20–7) || Grant Jackson (12–14) || None || see 2nd game || 54–80
|- style="background:#bfb"
| 135 || September 5 (2) || @ Mets || 4–2 || Rick Wise (12–11) || Jim McAndrew (6–6) || None || 40,450 || 55–80
|- style="background:#fbb"
| 136 || September 6 || @ Mets || 0–3 || Don Cardwell (6–9) || Jerry Johnson (6–12) || Tug McGraw (11) || 20,477 || 55–81
|- style="background:#fbb"
| 137 || September 7 || @ Mets || 3–9 || Nolan Ryan (5–1) || Bill Champion (5–8) || None || 28,937 || 55–82
|- style="background:#fbb"
| 138 || September 8 || Cardinals || 3–4 || Chuck Taylor (7–2) || Woodie Fryman (11–12) || Mudcat Grant (4) || 2,025 || 55–83
|- style="background:#fbb"
| 139 || September 9 || Cardinals || 2–6 || Nelson Briles (15–12) || Grant Jackson (12–15) || Mudcat Grant (5) || 2,547 || 55–84
|- style="background:#bfb"
| 140 || September 10 || Cubs || 6–2 || Rick Wise (13–11) || Ken Holtzman (16–10) || None || 4,164 || 56–84
|- style="background:#bfb"
| 141 || September 11 || Cubs || 4–3 || Jeff James (1–0) || Dick Selma (12–7) || Grant Jackson (1) || 4,255 || 57–84
|- style="background:#fbb"
| 142 || September 12 || Expos || 0–4 || Bill Stoneman (10–17) || Bill Champion (5–9) || None || 2,739 || 57–85
|- style="background:#fbb"
| 143 || September 13 || Expos || 5–7 || Dan McGinn (6–10) || Woodie Fryman (11–13) || Jerry Robertson (1) || 3,154 || 57–86
|- style="background:#fbb"
| 144 || September 14 || Expos || 2–7 || Steve Renko (5–6) || Grant Jackson (12–16) || Claude Raymond (2) || 3,327 || 57–87
|- style="background:#bfb"
| 145 || September 15 (1) || Pirates || 2–1 || Rick Wise (14–11) || Bob Veale (12–12) || None || see 2nd game || 58–87
|- style="background:#bfb"
| 146 || September 15 (2) || Pirates || 4–3 || Jeff James (2–0) || Bo Belinsky (0–3) || None || 2,933 || 59–87
|- style="background:#fbb"
| 147 || September 16 || Pirates || 5–9 || Bob Moose (11–3) || Woodie Fryman (11–14) || Joe Gibbon (10) || 1,169 || 59–88
|- style="background:#fbb"
| 148 || September 17 || @ Cubs || 7–9 || Ferguson Jenkins (20–14) || Bill Champion (5–10) || Rich Nye (3) || 6,062 || 59–89
|- style="background:#bfb"
| 149 || September 18 || @ Cubs || 5–3 || Grant Jackson (13–16) || Phil Regan (12–6) || None || 5,796 || 60–89
|- style="background:#fbb"
| 150 || September 19 (1) || @ Expos || 6–10 || Gary Waslewski (3–9) || Rick Wise (14–12) || Howie Reed (1) || see 2nd game || 60–90
|- style="background:#fbb"
| 151 || September 19 (2) || @ Expos || 1–3 || Steve Renko (6–6) || Jeff James (2–1) || None || 17,083 || 60–91
|- style="background:#bfb"
| 152 || September 20 || @ Expos || 6–4 || Woodie Fryman (12–14) || Mike Wegener (5–13) || None || 12,624 || 61–91
|- style="background:#fbb"
| 153 || September 21 || @ Expos || 6–7 || Dan McGinn (7–10) || Lowell Palmer (2–7) || None || 15,822 || 61–92
|- style="background:#bfb"
| 154 || September 23 || @ Pirates || 4–3 || Grant Jackson (14–16) || Bob Veale (13–13) || Jerry Johnson (1) || 2,364 || 62–92
|- style="background:#bbb"
| – || September 24 || @ Pirates || colspan=6 | Postponed (rain); Makeup: September 25 as a traditional double-header
|- style="background:#fbb"
| 155 || September 25 (1) || @ Pirates || 3–5 || Luke Walker (4–6) || Rick Wise (14–13) || None || see 2nd game || 62–93
|- style="background:#fbb"
| 156 || September 25 (2) || @ Pirates || 7–9 || Bob Moose (13–3) || Jeff James (2–2) || Joe Gibbon (11) || 2,379 || 62–94
|- style="background:#fbb"
| 157 || September 26 || Mets || 0–5 || Jerry Koosman (17–9) || Woodie Fryman (12–15) || None || 6,288 || 62–95
|- style="background:#fbb"
| 158 || September 27 || Mets || 0–1 || Tom Seaver (25–7) || Grant Jackson (14–17) || None || 4,297 || 62–96
|- style="background:#fbb"
| 159 || September 28 || Mets || 0–2 || Gary Gentry (13–12) || Jerry Johnson (6–13) || Ron Taylor (13) || 6,875 || 62–97
|- style="background:#bfb"
| 160 || September 30 || @ Cardinals || 4–3 || Rick Wise (15–13) || Santiago Guzmán (0–1) || None || 9,891 || 63–97
|-

|- style="background:#fbb"
| 161 || October 1 || @ Cardinals || 5–6 || Joe Hoerner (2–3) || Lowell Palmer (2–8) || None || 7,810 || 63–98
|- style="background:#fbb"
| 162 || October 2 || @ Cardinals || 2–3 (12) || Bob Gibson (20–13) || Grant Jackson' (14–18) || None || 11,680 || 63–99
|-

 Roster 

 Player stats 

 Batting 

 Starters by position Note: Pos = Position; G = Games played; AB = At bats; H = Hits; Avg. = Batting average; HR = Home runs; RBI = Runs batted in Other batters Note: G = Games played; AB = At bats; H = Hits; Avg. = Batting average; HR = Home runs; RBI = Runs batted in Pitching 

 Starting pitchers Note: G = Games pitched; IP = Innings pitched; W = Wins; L = Losses; ERA = Earned run average; SO = Strikeouts Other pitchers Note: G = Games pitched; IP = Innings pitched; W = Wins; L = Losses; ERA = Earned run average; SO = Strikeouts Relief pitchers Note: G = Games pitched; W = Wins; L = Losses; SV = Saves; ERA = Earned run average; SO = Strikeouts Farm system 

LEAGUE CHAMPIONS: Raleigh-Durham, Pulaski

 Notes 

 References 
1969 Philadelphia Phillies season at Baseball Reference''

Philadelphia Phillies seasons
Philadelphia Phillies season
Philadelph